Church History may refer to

The history of the Christian Church
The academic discipline of Church history 
The History of Christianity as a whole
Church History (journal)
Church History (Eusebius)
Ecclesiastical history (Catholicism)